Donovan Wolfington were an American punk rock band which formed in New Orleans, Louisiana, United States in 2011. The band consisted of Neil Berthier (vocals, guitar), Matthew Seferian (guitar, vocals), Alejandro Skalany (bass), and Mike Saladis (drums). The band released their debut album "Stop Breathing" in 2013 on Community Records and Broken World Media. Their follow-up EP "Scary Stories You Tell In The Dark" was released on Topshelf Records in 2014.

History
Donovan Wolfington began in 2011 with the release of their first EP "Sometimes, Nostalgia."

This was followed up by their full-length album entitled Stop Breathing via Broken World Media and Community Records.

In February 2014, Donovan Wolfington sign to Topshelf Records. In 2014, Donovan Wolfington released an EP titled Scary Stories You Tell In The Dark via Topshelf Records.

In August 2015, Donovan Wolfington released their second full-length album titled How to Treat the Ones You Love via Topshelf Records.

The band broke up in 2017. They released their final album, Waves in March 2018, and reconvened to perform a final concert at the Community Records 10th anniversary show on March 10 that year.

Band members
Neil Berthier (vocals, guitar)
Matt Seferian (vocals, guitar)
Alex Skalany (bass)
Michael Saladis (drums)

Past members
 Savannah Saxton (keyboards, vocals)

Discography

Studio albums
Stop Breathing (2013, Broken World Media and Community Records)
How to Treat the Ones You Love (2015, Topshelf Records)
Waves (2018, Community Records)

EPs
Sometimes Nostalgia (2011, self released)

Scary Stories You Tell In The Dark (2014, Topshelf Records)

References

Musical groups established in 2011
Musical groups from New Orleans
2011 establishments in Louisiana
American punk rock groups
Topshelf Records artists
Emo revival groups
American emo musical groups